The Diocese of Iztapalapa (Latin: Dioecesis Iztapalapanus) is a Latin Church ecclesiastical territory or diocese of the Catholic Church in Mexico.

History 
It was erected on 28 September 2019 with its territory having been  carved from the Archdiocese of Mexico. The diocese is a suffragan in the ecclesiastical province of the metropolitan Archdiocese of Mexico and covers a total of 105 parishes (75 parishes & 30 quasi-parishes) with 1,517,130 Catholics.

Ordinaries 
Jesús Antonio Lerma Nolasco: (28 Sep 2019 - 14 Aug 2021)
Jorge Cuapio Bautista: (14 Aug 2021 - Present)

References 

Iztapalapa
Christian organizations established in 2019
Iztapalapa
Iztapalapa, Roman Catholic Diocese of